Marcellus Ephraim Jones (June 5, 1830 – October 9, 1900) is reported as being the soldier who fired the first shot at the Battle of Gettysburg (1863).

Early life
Jones was born in Pawlet, Vermont, a son of Ephraim and Sophia (Page) Jones. In 1858, Jones moved to DuPage County, Illinois. He lived in Danby (now Glen Ellyn), until the American Civil War when Abraham Lincoln called for volunteers.

Civil War
Jones enlisted in Company E of the 8th Illinois Cavalry on August 5, 1861. He was commissioned a second lieutenant on December 5, 1862, first lieutenant July 4, 1864, and captain on October 10, 1864. All three commissions were signed by Illinois Governor Richard Yates.

On July 1, 1863 at Gettysburg, Jones commanded one of the regiment's sentry posts on the Chambersburg Pike, the road Robert E. Lee's Confederate army used to march from Cashtown to Gettysburg. About 7:30 a.m., Jones noticed a cloud of dust on the road to the west, indicating that the Confederates were approaching. At that point, Jones borrowed Corporal Levi S. Shafer's carbine, aimed it with the assistance of a fence rail, and fired a shot at "an officer on a white or light gray horse."

Honors

In 1886 a memorial was placed at the location where Jones fired the first shot of the battle. Jones was present for the dedication of the memorial, which remains on the north side of U.S. Route 30 (Chambersburg Pike) at the intersection of Knoxlyn Road.

Death
Marcellus E. Jones died on October 9, 1900 and was buried at Wheaton Cemetery in Wheaton, Illinois.

References

External links
The Battle of Gettysburg: Who Fired the First Shot?
Marcellus Jones' Marker
Marcellus Jones' House
Biography of Marcellus E. Jones

1830 births
1900 deaths
Union Army officers
People of Vermont in the American Civil War
People from Poultney (town), Vermont
People from Glen Ellyn, Illinois
Military personnel from Illinois